This is a list of the number-one songs of 2018 in Panama. The charts are published by Monitor Latino, based on airplay across radio stations in Panama using the Radio Tracking Data, LLC in real time. The chart week runs from Monday to Sunday.

During 2018, twelve singles reached number one in Panama; a thirteenth single, "Mi Gente (Remix)" by J Balvin and Willy William featuring Beyoncé began its run at number one in July 2017. Of those twelve number-one singles, ten were collaborations. In total, twenty-two acts topped the chart as either lead or featured artists, with fourteen—Becky G, Bad Bunny, Demi Lovato, Nicky Jam, Will Smith, Era Istrefi, Anitta, Lalo Ebratt, Trapical, DJ Snake, Selena Gomez, Cardi B, Ozuna and Kenny Man—achieving their first number-one single in Panama.

In Panama, the best-performing single of 2018 was "Dura" by Daddy Yankee. It spent 19 non-consecutive weeks atop the charts, becoming the second longest-running number-one song in the country, behind "Despacito" by Luis Fonsi (2017). With "Dura", Daddy Yankee holds the record as the act with the most cumulative weeks at number one in Panama, with 43 weeks in total.

J Balvin once again became the only act to have multiple number-one singles in Panama. In 2018, J Balvin earned three number-one songs: "X" with Nicky Jam, "No es justo" with Zion & Lennox and "Mocca (Remix)" with Lalo Ebratt. It became the third consecutive year that J Balvin hit a number-one song in the country.

Chart history

References 

Panamanian music-related lists
Panama
2018 in Panama